Lulić is a Bosnian and Croatian surname. Notable people with the surname include:

Karlo Lulić (born 1996), Croatian football midfielder 
Mirko Lulić  (born 1962), Croatian football defender
Senad Lulić (born 1986), Bosnian football midfielder

Bosnian surnames
Croatian surnames
Slavic-language surnames
Patronymic surnames